George Brodrick may refer to:

 George Brodrick, 3rd Viscount Midleton (1730–1765), British nobleman
 George Brodrick, 4th Viscount Midleton (1754–1836), British politician
 George Brodrick, 5th Viscount Midleton (1806–1848), British nobleman
 George Brodrick, 2nd Earl of Midleton (1888–1979), English aristocrat
 George Charles Brodrick (1831–1903), British historian